Electric Loco Shed, Bokaro Steel City is a motive power depot performing locomotive maintenance and repair facility for electric locomotives of the Indian Railways, located at Bokaro Steel City of the South Eastern Railway zone in Jharkhand, India.

Operations
Being one of the four electric engine sheds in South Eastern Railway, various major and minor maintenance schedules of electric locomotives are carried out here. It has the sanctioned capacity of 100 engine units. Beyond the operating capacity, this shed houses a total of 110 engine units, including 66 WAG-7 and 44 WAG-9. Like all locomotive sheds, BKSC does regular maintenance, overhaul and repair including painting and washing of locomotives.

Locomotives

References

Bokaro Steel City
Bokaro Steel City
2011 establishments in Jharkhand
Rail transport in Jharkhand